Below is a List of Hawaii politicians from the monarchical, republican, territorial, and statehood eras of history who have articles devoted to them on Wikipedia.  Also listed are politicians who were born and raised in Hawaii but have assumed political roles in other states or countries.



A
Neil Abercrombie, US Congress
Duke Aiona, lt. governor, judge
Bernard Akana, mayor of Hawaii County
Daniel Akaka, US senator
D. G. Anderson, party chair
Eileen Anderson, mayor of Honolulu
James Apana, mayor of Maui
Alan Arakawa, mayor of Maui
George R. Ariyoshi, governor, lt. governor
Charles N. Arnold, mayor of Honolulu

B
Duke Bainum, city council member
Henry Alexander Baldwin, US Congress delegate
Bryan J. Baptiste, mayor of Kauai
Della Au Belatti, state representative
Hiram Bingham III, Connecticut governor, US senator
Hiram Bingham IV, US vice consul to France
Neal Shaw Blaisdell, mayor of Honolulu
James Henderson Blount, US Minister to Hawai'i
Keiko Bonk, county council member
Robert Bunda, senate president
John A. Burns, US Congress delegate, governor

C
Romeo Munoz Cachola, city council member
George R. Carter, governor
Edward Espenett Case, US Congress
Campbell Cavasso, legislator
Benjamin J. Cayetano, governor, lt. governor
Charles Spencer Crane, mayor of Honolulu
Elmer F. Cravalho, mayor of Maui

D
Sanford Ballard Dole, chief justice, governor, overthrow conspirator, president of the republic
John Owen Dominis, prince consort, royal governor

F
Elizabeth Pruett Farrington, US Congress delegate
Joseph Rider Farrington, US Congress delegate
Wallace Rider Farrington, governor, mayor of Honolulu
Frank Francis Fasi, mayor of Honolulu
Joseph J. Fern, mayor of Honolulu
Lynn Finnegan, state representative
Hiram L. Fong, US senator
Galen Fox, state representative and convicted sex offender
Walter F. Frear, governor

G
Gerald Michael Gabbard, city council leader
Tulsi Gabbard, US Congress
Brickwood Galuteria, party chair
Thomas P. Gill, US Congress, lt. governor

H
Mufi Hannemann, mayor of Honolulu
Jeremy Harris, mayor of Honolulu
Cecil Heftel, US Congress
Mazie Hirono, lt. governor, US Congress
Victor Stewart Kaleoaloha Houston, US Congress delegate
Natalia Hussey-Burdick, state representative

I
Daniel Inouye, US Congress, US senator
Virginia Isbell, Hawaii County Council Member
Kim Coco Iwamoto, Board of Education member

J
William P. Jarrett, US Congress delegate
Gerrit P. Judd, Kingdom cabinet minister
Lawrence M. Judd, governor

K
Kaahumanu, queen regent, Kuhina Nui
David Kalakaua, king
Jonah Kuhio Kalanianaole, prince, US Congress delegate
Kamehameha I, king
Kamehameha II, king
Kamehameha III, king
Kamehameha IV, king
Kamehameha V, king
Ruth Keelikōlani, princess, royal governor
Harry Kim, mayor of Hawaii County
Samuel Wilder King, US Congress delegate, governor
Eric Alfred Knudsen, Speaker of Hawaii House of Representatives
John Adams Kuakini, governor of Hawaii island
Maryanne W. Kusaka, mayor of Kauai

L
John Carey Lane, mayor of Honolulu
Lili'uokalani, queen
Linda Lingle, governor, mayor of Maui, party chair
Oren E. Long, governor, US senator
William C. Lunalilo, king

M
Lincoln Loy McCandless, US Congress delegate
Charles J. McCarthy, governor
Eduardo Malapit, mayor of Kauai
Barbara Marshall, city council member
Herbert T. Matayoshi, mayor of Hawaii County
Spark M. Matsunaga, US Congress, US senator
Patsy Mink, US Congress

N
Emily I. Naeole, Hawaii county council member
Joseph Nawahi, Kingdom legislature and Minister of Foreign Affairs

O
Barack Obama, 44th president of the United States

P
Lester Petrie, mayor of Honolulu
Lucius E. Pinkham, governor
Joseph B. Poindexter, governor

Q
William F. Quinn, governor

R
Sean Reyes, Utah attorney general

S
Patricia F. Saiki, US Congress
Lehua Fernandes Salling, Hawaii Senate
Calvin Say, house speaker
Brian Schatz, representative, Hawaii House of Representatives
Ingram M. Stainback, governor
John L. Stevens, US Minister to Hawaii, overthrow conspirator

T
Hannibal Tavares, mayor of Maui
Lorrin A. Thurston, overthrow conspirator, founder of the republic
Wilfred Tsukiyama, Territorial Senator

W
John D. Waihee III, governor, lt. governor
Robert William Wilcox, US Congress delegate
Albert Sydney Willis, US Minister to Hawaii
John Henry Wilson, mayor of Honolulu
George Frederick Wright, mayor of Honolulu
Robert C. Wyllie, Minister of Foreign Affairs

Y
Stephen K. Yamashiro, mayor of Hawaii County
John Young, governor of Hawaii island

 Politicians